The 11th Assembly District of Wisconsin is one of 99 districts in the Wisconsin State Assembly.  Located in southeast Wisconsin, the district is entirely contained within north-central Milwaukee County.  It comprises parts of the north side of the city of Milwaukee, as well as the south half of the city of Glendale. The district is represented by Democrat Dora Drake, since 2021. The 11th Assembly district is located within Wisconsin's 4th Senate district, along with the 10th and 12th Assembly districts.

List of past representatives

References 

Wisconsin State Assembly districts
Milwaukee County, Wisconsin